The Iraqi National Card is an electronic biometric card issued by the Ministry of Interior from January 1, 2016. It replaced the Nationality Certificate and Civil Identification Document and the Residency Card. This card has a high security platform and is connected directly to the Iraqi Civil System, and can be used to travel within Iraq and Arab countries.

History
The Ministry of Interior awarded Giesecke & Devrient the contract for this project on October 31, 2013. The National Card was first issued starting September 13, 2015 and is rolling out to each of the 190 districts of Iraq over a period of several years with the goal of issuing an ID card to every Iraqi citizen.

Design
The new National Card is an ID-1 (credit card size) polycarbonate card with an embedded RFID chip. It is covered with multi-color guillochés. All the information on it is given in Arabic and Kurdish.

Front side
The front side shows the coat of arms of Iraq and the words "جمهورية العراق / Republic of Iraq",  "وزارة الداخلية / Ministry of Interior" and "مديرية الجنسية العامة / General Directorate of Nationality". 
It contains the following information:

 Photo of ID card holder
National identification number(12 decimal digits)
 Access number for RFID chip (9 alphanumeric digits)
 Given name
 Father's name
 Grandfather's name (paternal)
 Surname (only if holder has one)
 Mother's name
 Grandfather's name (maternal)
 Gender
 Blood type

Rear side
 Issuing authority
 Date of expiry (YYYY/MM/DD)
 Date of issue (YYYY/MM/DD)
 Place of birth (only the city/town of birth, no country)
 Date of birth (YYYY/MM/DD)
 Family number (18 alphanumeric digits)
 Machine-readable zone

Machine-readable zone
The MRZ is structured according to the ICAO standard for machine-readable ID cards.

First line

Second line

Third line

Empty spaces are represented by "<".

Security features
The identity card contains the following security features:
It has an RFID chip.

Cost
It costs 5,000 Iraqi dinars for a new card application, which is equal to US$4.

See also
 Iraqi nationality law
 Iraqi passport
 Driving licence in Iraq

External links
 Official website
 Iraqi General Directorate For Nationality

Notes

National identity cards by country
Government of Iraq